Persatuan Sepakbola Indonesia Jayapura, or Persipura, is an Indonesian football club based in Jayapura, Papua. The club was founded in 1963 and currently competes in the Liga 2. Persipura used to always use the Mandala Stadium as their home and to compete in Liga 2 for the 2022-2023 season, Persipura use Lukas Enembe Stadium. Persipura Papua is one of the giants of modern football in Indonesia with various league and tournament titles. Persipura is also known as the producer of great footballers from the land of Papua such as Rully Nere, Jack Komboy, Eduard Ivakdalam, Boaz Solossa, Ian Louis Kabes and Imanuel Wanggai. They are known for playing style relying on the abilities of individual players.

History

Foundation and early years (1963–1994) 
Persipura's history is mysterious. The club's administrators cannot fully make sure that the club was founded in 1963, since there are also proof that suggests the club might have been founded in 1965, 1962, or even 1950. Other than that, the administrators also cannot fully make sure Persipura's original name.

The early years were not filled with a lot of achievements. They only managed to win the Perserikatan First Division two times in 1979 and 1993. Other than that, they were runners-up in the 1980 Perserikatan season. In the final match of that season which took place on 31 August at Senayan Stadium, they lost to Persiraja Banda Aceh 3–1. The goalscorers were Leo Kapisa on 15th minute for Persipura, Rustam Syafari ('45), and Bustamam ('55, '81) for Persiraja.

Modern era and recent history (1994–present)

Liga Indonesia (1994-2007) 
Their first achievement in the modern era is by winning the 2005 Liga Indonesia Premier Division under coach Rahmad Darmawan. PT. Persipura Papua was established to fulfill the requirement to compete in the Indonesia Super League.

Indonesian Super League (2008-2015) 
Persipura dominated Indonesian football under the control of Brazilian coach Jacksen F. Tiago by winning the Indonesia Super League (ISL, present: Liga 1) in 2009, 2011 and 2013. They also managed to finish as runners-up three times during ISL era. When PSSI was under FIFA sanctions, Indonesia Soccer Championship was held in 2016 which the team came out as champions.

Liga 1 (2017-2022) 
Persipura endured difficult challenges in 2021-22 season which saw two senior figures Boaz Solossa and Tinus Pae were fired from the club due to disciplinary reasons, but the latter was signed back in mid-season. It also had its points deducted by 3 points after failing to appear in a match against Madura United F.C. on 21 February 2022. Eventually, after disappointing results all season, Persipura was relegated which ended its 29-year spell on the highest level of Indonesian football league. The team won its last match of the season against Persita Tangerang 3–0 on 31 March 2022, but it wasn't enough as PS Barito Putera, which had had 2 points advantage prior to the final matchday, drew 1–1 against Persib Bandung. Barito finished above Persipura although having the same points due to head-to-head rule.

Continental Competitions 
On many occasions, Persipura played in AFC Cup and AFC Champions League, which began from 2010 AFC Champions League group stage. They drew against Jeonbuk Hyundai Motors, Changchun Yatai F.C. and Kashima Antlers, which saw them finished bottom of the group with only one win against Changchun Yatai. In the following year, Persipura debuted in AFC Cup and advanced to the quarterfinals where they were beaten by an Iraqi team Erbil SC. In 2012, Persipura failed to qualify for 2012 AFC Champions League group stage, lost to Adelaide United FC in play-off.

In 2014, Persipura qualified again for AFC Cup, topped the group stage where they played against Churchill Brothers S.C., Home United, and New Radiant S.C. In Round of 16, they won against Yangon United F.C. 9-2 where Boakay Eddie Foday scored 5 goals. They also beat Kuwait SC in the quarter final and advanced to the semifinals to play against Qadsia SC. However, Persipura was beaten by the Kuwaiti team 10–2 on aggregate.

Persipura qualified for AFC Cup the third time in 2015 after finishing as runner-ups of 2014 Indonesia Super League. The group stage saw them finished first among Bengaluru FC, Maziya, and Warriors FC. In Round of 16, they were about to play against Pahang FA, but the Malaysian team could not attend the match due to visa reasons and the match was deemed a walkover. Eventually, Persipura's campaign ended when FIFA sanctioned PSSI which was intervened by Indonesian government, thus all football activities in Indonesia were suspended.

Persipura was scheduled to compete in 2021 AFC Cup, but the competition itself was cancelled due to COVID-19 pandemic.

Relegation 

in the 2021-22 season, Persipura were relegated due to the many defeats they experienced at the start of the season. Persipura finally started to improve after sacking coach Jacksen F. Tiago and replacing him with his former Argentina coach Angel Alfredo Vera. But unfortunately it was too late, Persipura finally had to be relegated from Liga 1 after finishing dramatically in 16th position out of 18 clubs.

Previously, Persipura only competed in the Divisi Utama Perserikatan (Second Division), after being relegated in 1989. They only got promoted again in 1993 after winning the Divisi Utama Perserikatan and then had to be relegated back to Liga 2 (Second Division), after 28 years of competing and making great history in Indonesia's top football competition.

Stadium 
Mandala Stadium
Persipura uses Mandala Stadium as their home ground. Located on Dock V Jayapura and Facing a beautiful view of Humboldt Bay, making Mandala Stadium as one of the Beautiful stadium view in South East Asia.

Lukas Enembe Stadium
Persipura used to always use the Mandala Stadium as their home and To compete in Liga 2 for the 2022-2023 season, Persipura received permission from the Governor of Papua Province, Lukas Enembe to use the biggest stadium in Papua which is Lukas Enembe Stadium along with the training field next to the main stadium. And also the archery athlete's guesthouse beside the main stadium is used by Persipura players to live in while doing training camps by also getting Gym and other facilities as well.

Supporters 
Their supporters are called Persipura Mania. They also have hardline fans or ultras namely Ultras BCN1963, Black Danger Community, The Karakas, and The Comen's

Sponsorship 
 Bank Papua
 PT. Freeport Indonesia
 Kuku BIma Ener-G

Kit supplier 

 Lotto (2009-2010)
 Specs (2010–present)

Coaches 

The coach whose name is in bold is the one who brings the champion.

Coaching staff

Players

Current squad

Out on loan

Season-by-season records 

QR Qualification Round
NP Not Participated

Note:
3rd position with Pupuk Kaltim. Knockout rounds are only statistics, not counting points.
 PS Barito Putera did not take part in the league
 Knockout rounds are only statistics, not counting points.
 Knockout rounds are only statistics, not counting points.
 League was suspended.
 Indonesia Soccer Championship A is an unofficial competition replacing Indonesia Super League which was suspended.

Player records

All time topscorer

Asian clubs ranking

Honours

AFC (Asian competitions)
 AFC Champions League
 2010 – Group stage
 2012 – Play-off round
 AFC Cup
 2011 – Quarter-finals
 2014 – Semi-finals
 2015 – Round of 16

Performances in AFC club competitions

See also 
 List of football clubs in Indonesia
 Indonesian football league system

Notes

References

External links 
 Official fansite 
 Persipura Jayapura at Liga Indonesia

 
Football clubs in Papua (province)
Jayapura
Football clubs in Indonesia
Indonesian Premier Division winners
Association football clubs established in 1963
1963 establishments in Indonesia